Raymundo Gleyzer (September 25, 1941 - missing since May 27, 1976) was an Argentine screenwriter and filmmaker. He specialized in documentaries and politically charged fiction films. Gleyzer was part of the left-wing faction of the Peronist political movement, and a staunch opponent of Argentina's last military dictatorship (1976-1983). In 1976 he was kidnapped, likely murdered and disappeared as part of the dictatorship's campaign of State-sponsored terrorism.

Biography 
Born into a Argentine Jewish family in Buenos Aires, Gleyzer became interested in politics and film early on in his life. From the start of his career he designed all of his films to be centered on the fight against social injustice and for political revolution in Latin America's countries.

He made his first film in the backward northeast of Brazil, where he barely escaped imminent death at the hands of the military dictatorship ruling there. In the early 1970s he made a film in Mexico about the so-called "institutionalized revolution" of the ruling party, the Institutional Revolutionary Party. The film was banned in Argentina at first, but found a lively echo in Mexico among the students. In 1973 he co-founded the  group, which organized demonstrations and discussions with workers (i.e. outside the cinema industry).

His last major film,  (The Traitors, 1973), presents a strong critique of the right-wing faction which prevailed in the Peronist political movement at the time and which also played a pivotal role in Juan Domingo Peron's third and last presidential term, in 1973. The film depicts how several union leaders had secretly and slowly aligned themselves —many years before Perón's comeback and inauguration for his third presidency— with the economical establishment, the military and United States's interests with the only goal of maintaning their personal power and enrich themselves.

On May 27, 1976, Gleyzer was abducted and tortured by a death squad of the Argentina's last military dictatorship that had come to power two months earlier, and never seen again. Brazilian cartoonist Carlos Latuff created a cartoon dedicated to Gleyzer and the violently "disappeared" people of Latin America.

Films 
 1964:  (The Land Burns) Short documentary
 1965:  (Ceramic workers behind the saw) 
 1966:  (It Happened in Hualfin) (Gleyzer as the screenwriter) Documentary
 1966:  (Our Malvinas Islands) Short documentary 
 1969:  (Elinda of the Valley) Short documentary
 1971: Swift 1971'' Documentary
 1971:  (Mexico: The Frozen Revolution) Documentary
 1972:  (Neither Forgotten nor Pardoned: 1972 the Trelew Massacre) Short documentary 
 1973:  (The Traitors). 16 mm, color. First presented on July 1, 1973, International Forum of Youth Films, Berlin.
 1975:  (They kill me if I don't work, and if I work they kill me: the workers strike of the INSUD factory)

Literature 
 Fernando Peña, Carlos Vallina:  Ediciones de la Flo, Buenos Aires 2000. 
 Adela, Pineda Franco: , no. 2, pp. 99–123, 2016.
 Adela Pineda Franco: Chapter 4. The Mexican Revolution on the World Stage: Intellectuals and Film in the Twentieth Century. SUNY Press, 2019.
  1970: . 1972/73:  . 1973/74:   .

External links 
 Official Site. Archived at Wayback Machine.
 
 Raymundo Gleyzer Cineismo 
 Documentary about Raymundo Gleyzer. Archived at Wayback Machine 
 About Gleyzer's disappearance Desaparecidos.org 
 Raymundo. Archived at Wayback Machine 
 Raymundo: the documentary Egrupos.net
 Our Islas Malvinas (1966) YouTube

1976 deaths
1941 births
Missing people
1976 crimes
People killed in the Dirty War
Argentine documentary film directors
Argentine people of Russian-Jewish descent